The Show-Off is a 1934  American comedy film directed by Charles Reisner and starring Spencer Tracy, Madge Evans and Henry Wadsworth. It is notable for being the first movie Tracy made for Metro-Goldwyn-Mayer; he was on loan-out from Fox at the time and later moved to MGM.

Based on the hit play of the same name by George Kelly, it made a profit of $78,000. Previously filmed twice by Paramount Pictures in 1926 and 1930, under the title Men Are Like That, and MGM remade the film in 1946, starring Red Skelton and Marilyn Maxwell.

Plot
Out sailing one day, J. Aubrey Piper saves a man from drowning. He overhears an impressed Amy Fisher's remark and looks her up in New Jersey, irritating her family with his constant bragging but winning Amy, who marries him.

A humble railroad clerk, Aubrey keeps pretending to be a more important man. He spends lavishly, piling up so much debt that he and Amy must move in with her parents. He gets fired by his boss Preston for making a wild offer on a piece of land, overstepping his authority by far.

Amy is fed up and intends to leave him. Aubrey runs into her brother Joe, an inventor whose rust-prevention idea has received a firm offer of $5,000. Aubrey goes to the firm and demands Joe get $100,000 plus a 50% ownership interest. The company rescinds its offer entirely.

Everybody's fed up with Aubrey, but suddenly Joe rushes home to say the company's changed its mind, offering him $50,000 plus 20%. And the railroad property paid off, too, so Aubrey's offered his old job back, with a raise. He knows how lucky he's been and that he should just shut up, but he just can't.

Cast
 Spencer Tracy as Aubrey Piper
 Madge Evans as Amy Fisher Piper
 Henry Wadsworth as Joe Fisher
 Lois Wilson as Clara Harling
 Grant Mitchell as Mr. 'Pa' Fisher
 Clara Blandick as Mrs. 'Ma' Fisher
 Alan Edwards as Frank Harling
 Claude Gillingwater as J.B. Preston

Radio adaptation

The Show-Off was adapted twice for radio by the Lux Radio Theatre. The first one-hour broadcast was on December 9, 1935, starring Joe E. Brown; the second was on February 1, 1943, starring Harold Peary.

References

External links
The Show Off at IMDb
The Show Off at TCMDB

1934 films
Metro-Goldwyn-Mayer films
1934 comedy films
American comedy films
Films with screenplays by Herman J. Mankiewicz
American black-and-white films
Films directed by Charles Reisner
1930s American films